Jennifer Morden is a Canadian film and television production designer. She is most noted as a two-time Canadian Screen Award nominee for Best Art Direction or Production Design, receiving nods at the 8th Canadian Screen Awards in 2019 for Riot Girls and at the 9th Canadian Screen Awards in 2021 for The Kid Detective.

Her other credits have included the films Pyotr495, Seven in Heaven and Flashback.

References

External links

Canadian production designers
Canadian women in film
Living people
Year of birth missing (living people)
Women production designers